Kratzer Run is a  long 3rd order tributary to Anderson Creek in Clearfield County, Pennsylvania.  This is the only stream of this name in the United States.  Kratzer Run is the largest tributary to Anderson Creek and drains a region of farmland and places that have been surface mined for coal.  As a result, Kratzer Run suffers from Acid Mine Drainage (AMD) and the impact of adjacent highways and communities is considered the most degraded tributary to Anderson Creek.  Bilger Run, a tributary, is also impaired by AMD.  Numerous places of erosion have been noted as well.  In spite of the impacts, numerous efforts are underway to mitigate the pollution.

Variant names
According to the Geographic Names Information System, it has also been known historically as:
 Little Anderson Run

Course 
Kratzer Run rises about 1 mile southeast of Grampian, Pennsylvania, and then flows generally east to join Anderson Creek at Bridgeport.

Watershed 
Kratzer Run drains  of area, receives about 43.3 in/year of precipitation, has a wetness index of 368.63, and is about 63% forested.

See also 
 List of Pennsylvania Rivers

References

External links 
Kratzer Run Assessment and Coldwater Conservation Plan

Watershed Maps 

Rivers of Pennsylvania
Rivers of Clearfield County, Pennsylvania